Untitled is a post-bop/avant-garde/fusion jazz album by Jack DeJohnette on ECM Records ECM 1074, and is the second in a series of albums released under the heading “Jack DeJohnette’s Directions.”

The album consists of compositions by DeJohnette and the other musicians playing on the session, which was recorded in Oslo, Norway.

Track listing 
"Flying Spirits" (DeJohnette) – 13:50
"Pansori Visions" (DeJohnette/Abercrombie) – 2:20
"Fantastic" (DeJohnette/Abercrombie/Foster/Richmond) – 5:52
"The Vikings Are Coming" (DeJohnette) – 6:43
"Struttin" (DeJohnette/Foster/Abercrombie) – 6:30
"Morning Star" (Bernhardt) – 7:22
"Malibu Reggae" (DeJohnette)– 3:03

Reissues
Untitled was originally released on LP, 8-track, and cassette. In 2019, it was released as a digital download. To date, it has not been reissued as a CD.

Personnel 
Musicians
 Jack DeJohnette – drums, tenor saxophone
 John Abercrombie – electric guitar, acoustic guitar
 Mike Richmond – double bass, electric bass
 Alex Foster – tenor saxophone, soprano saxophone
 Warren Bernhardt – piano, electric piano, clavinet, cowbell

Production
Producer: Manfred Eicher
Engineer: Jan Erik Kongshaug
Cover design: Frieder Grindler
Photo: Roberto Masotti

References 

Jack DeJohnette albums
1976 albums
Albums produced by Manfred Eicher
ECM Records albums